Passion is a 1954 American Western film directed by Allan Dwan and written by Howard Estabrook, Beatrice A. Dresher and Joseph Lejtes. The film stars Cornel Wilde, Yvonne De Carlo, Raymond Burr, Lon Chaney Jr., Rodolfo Acosta and John Qualen. The film was released on October 6, 1954, by RKO Pictures.

Plot
A greedy California land baron stakes a claim to the property of Gaspar Melo, sending hired guns to seize control. A rancher, Juan Obreon, learns that Melo's granddaughter Rosa has given birth to a baby. Juan is the child's father and intends to marry Rosa, but she is forced to hide her new son before hired gun Sandro shoots her.

Rosa has a sister, Tonya, who flees before Sandro or his man Castro can find her. Captain Rodriguez, a friend of Juan's, becomes involved when Juan seeks vengeance for Rosa by killing the new land owner's men. Thanks to the captain's intervention, Juan is able to live in peace with Tonya and his child.

Cast 
Cornel Wilde as Juan Obreon
Yvonne De Carlo as Rosa Melo / Tonya Melo
Raymond Burr as Captain Rodriguez
Lon Chaney Jr. as Castro 
Rodolfo Acosta as Salvator Sandro
John Qualen as Gaspar Melo
Anthony Caruso as Sergeant Muñoz
Frank de Kova as Martinez

Production
The film was known as Where the Wind Dies. Cornel Wilde's casting was announced in March 1954 with Benedict Bogeaus to produce for Filmcrest Productions and Harmon Jones to direct. Yvonne de Carlo signed to play his co-star.

Eventually Dwan directed. It was one of a series of movies Allan Dwan made for producer Benedict Bogeaus.

References

External links 
 
Passion at TCMDB
Review of film at The New York Times

1954 films
American black-and-white films
Films directed by Allan Dwan
American Western (genre) films
1954 Western (genre) films
Films about twin sisters
1950s English-language films
1950s American films